Sibnica may refer to:

Sibnica (Sopot), inhabited place in Sopot municipality
Sibnica (Žabari), inhabited place in Žabari municipality
Sibnica (Rekovac), inhabited place in Rekovac municipality
Sibnica (Kraljevo), inhabited place in Kraljevo municipality 
Sibnica (Blace), inhabited place in Blace municipality